Edge of Doom is a 1950 black-and-white film noir directed by Mark Robson and starring Dana Andrews, Farley Granger, and Joan Evans.

Plot
The story concerns a young mentally disturbed man, Martin Lynn (Farley Granger), who goes on a rampage after his sick mother dies. One of his main targets is the Catholic Church which, in addition to slighting him when his mother needed a priest, refused to bury his father years earlier because he committed suicide. The man, blaming the environment he lives in, takes revenge on his cheap boss, a mortician and a Catholic priest, Father Kirkman (Harold Vermilyea), who refuses to give his poor mother a big funeral. He begins by killing the hard-line priest who slighted him by beating him with a heavy crucifix. Later, a young priest, Father Roth (Dana Andrews), suspects the young man, who has been arrested for another crime, of the killing.

Cast
 Dana Andrews as Father Thomas Roth
 Farley Granger as Martin Lynn
 Joan Evans as Rita Conroy
 Robert Keith as Lieutenant Mandel
 Paul Stewart as Craig
 Mala Powers as Julie, Martin's girlfriend
 Adele Jergens as Irene, Craig's girlfriend
 John Ridgely as 1st Detective
 Douglas Fowley as 2nd Detective
 Harold Vermilyea as Father Kirkman
 Mabel Paige as Mrs. Pearson
 Ellen Corby as Mrs. Jeanette Moore
 Robert Karnes as George, a Priest narrated to

Reception

Critical response
When the film was released, the staff at Variety magazine gave the film a positive review, writing, "A grim, relentless story, considerably offbeat, gives some distinction to Edge of Doom. It is played to the hilt by a good cast and directed with impact by Mark Robson."  The New York Times wrote, "Robson's direction gives flashes of high tension to the film, for he has made effective use of street scenes and noises and has skillfully reflected the oppressive atmosphere of poverty and squalor, but his actors run more to types than to real people."

Awards
Wins
 National Board of Review of Motion Pictures: NBR Award - Top Ten Films; 1950.

References

External links
 
 
 
 

1950 films
1950 drama films
American black-and-white films
Film noir
Films based on American novels
Films directed by Mark Robson
Films scored by Hugo Friedhofer
Samuel Goldwyn Productions films
American drama films
1950s English-language films
1950s American films